Pompilus is a minor character in Greek mythology who incurred the wrath of the god Apollo when he foiled the god's plans as he was chasing the nymph Ocyrhoe.

Mythology 
During a festival in honour of Artemis in the city of Miletus, in western Asia Minor, the god Apollo became infatuated with Ocyrhoe, a young Samian nymph, daughter of a local river god in Samos. Apollo chased Ocyrhoe, but she ran away from him. Finally she reached the shore and there she ran into Pompilus, a seafarer and old family friend of her father Imbrasos. Pompilus agreed to let her board his boat, and transferred her to the nearby island of Samos. But as they reached the coast of Samos, they found Apollo waiting for them in there. Apollo grabbed Ocyrhoe and turned Pompilus into a pilot fish as a punishment for trying to sabotage his plans. Both authors who mention this tale, Athenaeus and Claudius Aelianus, quote second century BC author Apollonius of Rhodes.

See also 

 Aglaurus
 Caanthus
 Psalacantha

References

Bibliography 
 Athenaeus, The Learned Banqueters, Volume V: Books 10.420e-11. Edited and translated by S. Douglas Olson. Loeb Classical Library 274. Cambridge, MA: Harvard University Press, 2009.
 Aelian, On Animals, Volume III: Books 12-17, translated by A. F. Scholfield, Loeb Classical Library No. 449, Cambridge, Massachusetts, Harvard University Press, 1959.  Online version at Harvard University Press. .

Deeds of Apollo
Metamorphoses into animals in Greek mythology
Anatolian characters in Greek mythology